Thomas Michael Smith (16 May 1899 — 17 November 1965) was an English cricketer who played for Hampshire County Cricket Club during 1923 and 1924.

Smith was born in Lambeth in London and made his first-class cricket debut during the 1923 season, against Glamorgan. He made five appearances in 1923, with a top score of 16 not out. In the following season, he made four appearances, including a top score of 18 in his final appearance for the side, his highest first-class score.

Between 1928 and 1930, Smith made three appearances for a Gold Coast Europeans side, including a top score of 70 runs in his second appearance for the team. He died at Taunton in Somerset in 1965 aged 66.

References

External links

1899 births
1965 deaths
English cricketers
Hampshire cricketers